Allan H. Goldman (born 1943) was an American real estate investor and co-Chairman of the real estate investment company Solil Management. He died on January 15, 2022.

Biography
Goldman was born in 1943 to a Jewish family, the daughter of Lillian (née Schuman) and Sol Goldman. He has three sisters: Jane Goldman, Diane Goldman Kemper, and Amy Goldman Fowler. His father was the largest non-institutional real estate investor in New York City in the 1980s, owning a portfolio of nearly 1,900 commercial and residential properties. After his father's death, his three sisters engaged in litigation with their mother over his father's assets; their mother subsequently received 1/3rd of their father's estate. He and his sister, Jane Goldman, manage the remaining real estate assets via the firm Solil Management. His cousin, Lloyd Goldman, is also a notable real-estate investor in New York City.

References

American billionaires
American real estate businesspeople
20th-century American Jews
1943 births
Living people
Sol Goldman family
21st-century American Jews